William A. Darity Jr. (born April 19, 1953)  is an American economist and social sciences researcher. Darity's research spans economic history, development economics, economic psychology, and the history of economic thought, but most of his research is devoted to group-based inequality, especially with respect to race and ethnicity. His 2005 paper in the Journal of Economics and Finance established Darity as the 'founder of stratification economics.' His varied research interests have also included the trans-Atlantic slave trade, African American reparations and the economics of black reparations, and social and economic policies that affect inequities by race and ethnicity. For the latter, he has been described as "perhaps the country’s leading scholar on the economics of racial inequality."

He is currently the Samuel DuBois Cook Professor of Public Policy, African and African American Studies, and Economics at Duke University; he is also the director of the Samuel DuBois Cook Center on Social Equity at Duke University. Previously he was the Cary C. Boshamer Professor of Economics and Sociology at the University of North Carolina. Darity was a visiting scholar at the Federal Reserve's Board of Governors in 1984, and a fellow at the National Humanities Center (1989-1990), a Visiting Fellow at the Center for the Advanced Study in the Behavioral Sciences (2011-2012), and a Visiting Senior Fellow at the Russell Sage Foundation. For the 2022-2023 academic year, he is the Katherine Hampson Bessett Fellow at the Radcliffe Institute. He is also a former president of the National Economic Association (1986), the Southern Economic Association (1996), and the Association of Black Sociologists (2015-2017).

Early life, education
William A. "Sandy" Darity Jr. was born in Norfolk, Virginia and spent time in his childhood in Beirut, Lebanon; Alexandria, Egypt; and Chapel Hill, North Carolina. His adolescent years were spent primarily in Amherst, Massachusetts. His parents were William A. Darity Sr., a long-time faculty member and the founding Dean of the School of Public Health at the University of Massachusetts at Amherst, and his mother, Evangeline Royal Darity, was a faculty member and administrator at Smith College and Mt. Holyoke College. He has one sibling, Janiki Evangelia Darity, who works as an attorney.
 
Darity Jr. graduated magna cum laude with a bachelor's degree from Brown University in 1974, where he earned honors in economics and political science. He was named a Marshall Scholar after undergraduate school, and on the scholarship spent one year studying at the London School of Economics and Political Science. In 1978 he completed a doctorate in economics at the Massachusetts Institute of Technology.

Academic career
In 1980, Darity became a staff economist in the research department of the National Urban League. He began a long period as a professor at the University of North Carolina at Chapel Hill in 1983. He was then a visiting scholar at the Federal Reserve's Board of Governors in 1984.

Darity has served as a director or on the board of a number of organizations. From 1989 to 1990 was a fellow at the National Humanities Center. He became a member of the American Economic Association's executive committee from 1993 to 1996, and in 1997 he was President of the Southern Economic Association. He is also a former president of the National Economic Association.

He has served as a professor at Grinnell College, the University of Maryland at College Park, the University of Texas at Austin, Simmons College in Boston, and Claremont McKenna College. From 2003 to 2005 he was a William and Camille Cosby Endowed Professor at Spelman College. He has also either taught or served as a fellow at London School of Economics and Political Science, the University of Tulsa and the Centro de Excelencia Empresarial (Monterey, Mexico).

Darity was awarded the 2012 Westerfield Award from the National Economic Association, their highest honor. Previous recipients include Nobel Laureate Sir W. Arthur Lewis, Phyllis Ann Wallace and Marcus Alexis.  He was also honored as the Lewis-Oaxaca Distinguished Lecturer at the 2016 American Economic Association's Summer Mentoring Pipeline Conference.

University of North Carolina
After joining the staff in 1983, Darity became the Cary C. Bohamer Professor of Economics and Sociology at the University of North Carolina He taught economics and was a research professor of public policy, African and African-American studies, and economics. He directed the economics department's undergraduate honors and graduate studies programs.

In 2001 he was appointed Director of UNC's Institute of African American Research. The institute's stated mission is "to help lead scholarly investigation into all aspects of black life, as well as public and private policies and programs affecting their lives."

Duke University
As of 2012, Darity is the Arts and Sciences Professor of Public Policy in the Sanford School at Duke University. He is also chair of the school's department of African and African American Studies and Economics, research professor of their Public Policy Studies, and director of their Research Network on Racial and Ethnic Inequality.

Publications
Darity has published more than 250 articles in professional journals, including the American Economic Review, the Journal of Economic Perspectives, the Journal of Economic Literature, The Review of Black Political Economy, the Journal of Economic Behavior and Organization, the American Sociological Review, the Journal of Socio-Economics, and the Journal of Human Resources. His research has also been featured on National Public Radio and PBS. He has made editorial contributions to news outlets including the New York Times, the Washington Post, the Philadelphia Inquirer, the Philadelphia Tribune, the Boston Globe, Bloomberg, the Los Angeles Times, and Black Star News. In 2008, Darity was editor-in-chief of the International Encyclopedia of the Social Sciences.

Research

Focus
Darity's research has been wide-ranging, but a central organizing theme of his work has been exploration of multiple aspects of economic inequality. That interest has led him to examine the phenomenon of colorism, discrimination in the labor market and "marriage market" outcomes, parallels between caste inequality in India and racial inequality in the United States, ethnic diversity and conflict, the social psychological effects of exposure to unemployment, and schooling and the racial achievement gap. At the international level, Darity has studied financial crises in developing countries, North-South theories of development and trade, and the relationship between the Trans-Atlantic slave trade and the Industrial Revolution. He also has examined the relationship between research in the social sciences on race and racism and African American fictional literature and film.

Notable studies

Discrimination in employment
With Samuel Myers Jr., Darity conducted a series of studies on the statistical measurement of discrimination in labor markets. In 1998, he published his most cited paper with Patrick Mason in the Journal of Economic Perspective where they advanced a detailed critique of the two dominant theoretical approaches to discrimination in economics, the taste and the statistical models. His research with Arthur Goldsmith on the psycho-emotional impact of joblessness led to a companion study demonstrating that taking into account motivation more than offset the negative impact on estimates of discrimination from inclusion of measures of Armed Forces Qualification Test Scores in the analysis. With Major Coleman and Rhonda Sharpe, Darity was a member of a team that found in a paper published in the American Journal of Economics and Sociology in 2008 that white workers tend to grossly over-report their exposure to discrimination in the workplace, while black workers tend to grossly under-report their exposure to discrimination in the workplace.

Baby bonds program
With economist Darrick Hamilton, Darity has proposed a federal asset building program aimed at remediating the racial wealth gap. Popularly labeled "baby bonds," the program calls for the issuance of a publicly funded trust account for each newborn child accessible when the child reaches young adulthood. The amount of the trust account is to be calibrated on the basis of the child’s family’s wealth position.

Job guarantee
A long-time advocate of a federal job guarantee, in 2012, in response to the protracted economic crisis produced by the Great Recession, Darity called for establishment of the National Investment Employment Corps, assuring all U.S. citizens over the age of 18 employed work at a salary above the poverty line as well as the standard benefits package for all civil servants, including medical coverage and retirement savings.

Reparations
In 1989, while preparing the introduction for a volume of essays, edited by Richard America, by economists gauging the size of a reparations fund for African Americans, Darity became convinced that a program of redress of this type is an essential step that must be taken by the nation. He has spent the subsequent three decades doing intensive research on and engaged in advocacy for black reparations. As early as 2003, he published a paper coauthored with Dania Frank Francis in the proceedings of the American Economic Association called “The Economics of Reparations.” Subsequently, in 2008, he published the article “Forty Acres and a Mule in the Twenty-First Century” in Social Science Quarterly. In 2020, with A. Kirsten Mullen, he published From Here to Equality: Reparations for Black Americans in the Twenty-First Century, a book that synthesized and extended his previous work on the topic. 

As a leading voice in the current national conversation on African American reparations, Darity argues recipients must be black Americans whose ancestors were enslaved in the United States, the monetary target must be sufficient funds to eliminate black-white differences in average wealth, the federal government must execute the program, and the major form of outlays must be direct payments to eligible recipients.

Partial publication history
Labor Economics: Problems in Analyzing Labor Markets (1992, editor)
Macroeconomics (1994, co-author)
Persistent Disparity: Race and Economic inequality in the United States since 1945 (1999, co-author)
 Boundaries of Clan and Color: Transnational Comparisons of Inter-Group Disparity (2003, co-editor)
 Economics, Economists, and Expectations: Microfoundations to Macroapplications (2004, co-author)
 International Encyclopedia of the Social Sciences (2007, editor-in-chief)
International Encyclopedia of the Social Sciences Volume 2: Cohabitation Ethics in Experimentation (2007, editor-in-chief)
For-Profit Universities: The Shifting Landscape of Marketized Higher Education (2017, editor)
From Here to Equality: Reparations for Black Americans in the Twentieth Century (2020, co-author)

References

External links
 
 Complete publication history
 Interview on BlogTalkRadio(March 2010)
 OurCommonGround.com

Living people
1953 births
Brown University alumni
Alumni of the London School of Economics
MIT School of Humanities, Arts, and Social Sciences alumni
20th-century American economists
21st-century American economists
African-American economists
Grinnell College faculty
University of Maryland, College Park faculty
University of Texas at Austin faculty
Simmons University faculty
Claremont McKenna College faculty
Spelman College faculty
Academics of the London School of Economics
University of Tulsa faculty
University of North Carolina at Chapel Hill faculty
Duke University faculty
Macroeconomists
Marshall Scholars
Public economists
Black studies scholars
American economic historians
Welfare economists
Political economists
Labor economists
Cultural economists
Historians from California
Presidents of the National Economic Association